On My Way to Where was the first solo LP by Dory Previn, released in 1970.

Dory Previn established herself from the late 1950s as a lyricist for movie songs in Hollywood, in the process being nominated for three Academy Awards. However, by 1970 her marriage to composer and conductor André Previn had disintegrated, following his affair with Mia Farrow and her own mental health problems. She retreated into a hospital, where, as therapy, she was encouraged to write songs of self-analysis. With producer Nik Venet, she recorded On My Way To Where for his Mediarts company, which was later taken over by United Artists.

The album established her as a confessional singer-songwriter, revealing and analysing problems of childhood abuse, mental health and divorce. "Beware of Young Girls" was a sharp attack on Mia Farrow set to the melody of a traditional lullaby. The songs were performed by many of the top session musicians of the time.

In 2013, jazz singer Kate Dimbleby and pianist Naadia Sheriff revisited Previn's body of work—with special attention to the songs of On My Way to Where—in the London cabaret show, Beware Of Young Girls: The Dory Previn Story.

Track listing
"Scared to Be Alone"
"I Ain't His Child"
"Esther's First Communion"
"He Lives Alone"
"With My Daddy In the Attic"
"The Veterans Big Parade"
"Michael Michael"
"Beware of Young Girls"
"Twenty-Mile Zone"
"Mr. Whisper"

Personnel
Dory Previn – vocals, guitar
Jimmy Bond, Carol Kaye – double bass
Dennis Budimir, David Cohen, Herb Ellis, Bernie Leadon, John Morell, Tommy Tedesco, John Buck Wilkin – guitar
Frank Capp – drums, percussion
Buddy Collette – saxophone, flute, clarinet
Larry Knechtel, Michael Lang, Don Randi, Joe Sample – keyboards
Tom Sowell – harmonica, theremin, moog synthesizer
Ron Tutt – drums

References 

1970 debut albums
Dory Previn albums
Albums produced by Nick Venet
United Artists Records albums
Mediarts Records albums